Jattaea is a genus of fungi in the family Calosphaeriaceae.

The genus name of Jattaea is in honour of Antonio Jatta (1852–1912), who was an Italian politician and lichenologist..

The genus was circumscribed by Augusto Napoleone Berlese in Icon. Fung. vol.3 on page 6 in 1900.

Species
Jattaea algeriensis
Jattaea berlesiana
Jattaea brevirostris
Jattaea ceanothina
Jattaea cornina
Jattaea curvicolla
Jattaea faginea
Jattaea herbicola
Jattaea leucospermi
Jattaea microtheca
Jattaea mookgoponga
Jattaea pleurostoma
Jattaea prunicola
Jattaea spermatozoides
Jattaea stachybotryoides
Jattaea villosa

References

External links 

Sordariomycetes genera
Calosphaeriales